Winged dock is a common name for several plants and may refer to:

Rumex spiralis
Rumex venosus, native to central and western North America